
Wierzchowice  (German: Hochweiler) is a village in the administrative district of Gmina Krośnice, within Milicz County, Lower Silesian Voivodeship, in south-western Poland.

During World War II the Germans established and operated a subcamp of the Gross-Rosen concentration camp in the village, whose prisoners were Jewish women transported from the Auschwitz concentration camp.

References

Wierzchowice